The Territet–Glion funicular railway is a funicular in Switzerland, which runs between the Territet and Glion suburbs of the town of Montreux. At its upper terminus, the funicular connects with the Montreux–Glion–Rochers-de-Naye railway line.

what was the lower terminus of the Chemin de fer Glion-Rochers-de-Naye (GN) mountain railway, which opened in 1892. This later line was joined, in 1909, in an end on junction at Glion with the newly constructed Chemin de fer Montreux-Glion (MGl).

History
The line was opened in 1883, making it one of the oldest funiculars in Switzerland (the Giessbachbahn, opened in 1879, is the oldest). The stations had two side platforms.

The Chemin de fer Glion-Rochers-de-Naye opened a line from Rochers de Naye to Glion in 1892, connecting with the upper terminus of the funicular. Those two railway companies merged in 1987 to become the Chemin de fer Montreux-Glion-Rochers-de-Naye, and that company merged with the Chemin de fer funiculaire Territet–Glion in 1992 to create the Chemin de fer Montreux-Territet-Glion-Rochers-de-Naye. That company, in turn, was one of four that merged in 2001 to create the Transports Montreux-Vevey-Riviera (MVR).

Up to the mid-1980s the railway operated by gravity alone: Both cars had a water tank under their decks and the one at the upper station was filled with water while the one at the lower station (Territet) was dumping its contents in Lake Geneva (Lac Leman). Once the fill-dump process and passenger boarding were complete the brakes were gradually released and since both cars were attached by a single cable passing over a pulley arrangement at Glion, the heavier car descended the slope carrying up the lighter car. The process was then repeated so the car uphill was always filled and the one downhill always empty and thus pulled uphill when brakes were released. An added picturesque note was that the two car operators were communicating for synchronisation with whistles instead of an intercom or similar device. Eventually the system was abandoned and the train now uses electric traction.

With rebuilding the line adapted the more conventional approach in which only a single track is used, the two rails opening at the halfway point to form a passing loop. One flanking (side) platform is in use at each station, however the second platform which was originally used can still be seen.

The funicular was closed from 8 June to 2 October 2009 for maintenance work to be carried out and the two cars were taken to the MOB workshops at Chernex for attention and repainting in the new "Golden Pass" livery. A certain amount of rewiring was carried out along with a metal stairway on one side of the track (right hand side when going up) for the full length of the line being erected. Work was also carried out on the station shelters including a replacement roof.

In the 2009 repaint the cars were painted in a gold (lower portion) and white (upper portion) livery scheme and rebranded "Golden Pass". The new colours will be applied to the other funiculars in the Golden Pass Group as well as buses and trains, other than the Golden Pass Panoramic and Golden Pass Classic which they operate.

Services
The service, in each direction, commences at 05h25, then at 05h45 and every 15 minutes until 21h15, 21h45 and every 30 minutes until 23h15, 23h50, 00h20 and 00h45. On Saturday and Sunday mornings there is a service at 01h30.

See also 
 List of funicular railways
 List of funiculars in Switzerland
 Water counterbalancing

Notes

References
 Official documentation from the MOB
 Journal de Pays d'Enhaut, 1 October 2009
 

Territet-Glion, Chemin de fer funiculaire
Transport in the canton of Vaud
Former water-powered funicular railways converted to electricity
Metre gauge railways in Switzerland
Railway lines opened in 1883
Transports Montreux–Vevey–Riviera lines